Bao, also known as baozi, is a type of Chinese dumpling made of steamed or baked bun with fillings.

Bao or BAO may also refer to:

Cuisine
 Gua bao, steamed clam-shaped bun sandwiched with meat and condiments originating from Fujian, China
 Bánh bao, Vietnamese dumpling with pork meat inside, derived from the Chinese bao
 Bao stir-frying, a high heat variant of the Chinese stir frying technique

People
 Bao (surname), a common pronunciation for some Chinese surnames, such as 包 and 鮑
 Bao Zheng or Lord Bao, Chinese judge of Song China
 Justice Bao (disambiguation)
 Bao (musician), Vietnamese-American musician

Acronyms
 Baccalaureus in Arte Obstetricia, Bachelor of Obstetrics, a medical degree unique to Ireland
 Baryon acoustic oscillations, in physical cosmology
 Batman: Arkham Origins
 Beijing Astronomical Observatory
 Benny Anderssons orkester
 BAO!, their second studio album
 Bruce Artwick Organization
 Bullets And Octane

Others
 Bao (film), 2018 Pixar short film about an animated bao dumpling
 Bao (game), a board game from East Africa
 Barium oxide (BaO)
 A variant of the game of mancala

See also